Christopher Maynard (born 8 April 1958) is a former English cricketer active from 1978 to 1986 who played for Lancashire and Warwickshire. He was born in Haslemere, Surrey. He appeared in 117 first-class matches as a righthanded batsman and wicketkeeper. He scored 2,541 runs with a highest score of 132*, his only century, and held 186 catches with 28 stumpings.

Notes

1958 births
English cricketers
Lancashire cricketers
Warwickshire cricketers
Living people
D. H. Robins' XI cricketers